Venezuelan literature can be traced to pre-Hispanic times with the myths and oral literature that formed the cosmogonic view of the world that indigenous people had. Some of these stories are still known in Venezuela. Like many Latin American countries, the Spanish conquerors have had the greatest effect on both the culture and the literature. The first written documents by the Spanish colonizers are considered to be the origin of Venezuela's written literature.  This has included chronicles, letters, acts, etc. 

Venezuela's first major writer was Andrés Bello. Venezuelan literature developed in the 19th century with the formation of Venezuela as a nation state and the political conflicts of the time between conservatives and liberals. Notable works include Venezuela Heroica (1881), by Eduardo Blanco, on the Venezuelan War of Independence.

In the 20th century, with the modernization and urbanization of Venezuela thanks to the economic boom provided by petroleum, some of its finest writers were: Teresa de la Parra, Rómulo Gallegos, Arturo Uslar Pietri, Salvador Garmendia. Gallegos' Doña Bárbara (1929) was described in 1974 as "possibly the most widely known Latin American novel". The National Prize for Literature, awarded annually, was established in 1948, with Uslar Pietri the only writer to win twice in the first five decades.

Rafael Cadenas and Eugenio Montejo are among the best known poets of the 20th century and the beginning of the 21st century.

In the 21st century, with the Venezuelan refugee crisis, migration has become a predominant topic in Venezuelan literature. Many Venezuelan writers live and publish outside the country, notably in Spain, the USA and other parts of Latin America.

See also 
 List of Venezuelan writers
 Latin American literature
 Culture of Venezuela

References

External links
País Portátil: Contemporary Venezuelan Literature and Arts

 
Latin American literature by country
South American literature
Spanish-language literature